The Terrigal Formation is a geologic formation in the Sydney Basin in eastern Australia. Commonly seen in the Central Coast region, this stratum is up to 330 metres thick. Formed in the early to mid Triassic, it is part of the Narrabeen Group of sedimentary rocks. This formation includes interbedded fine to medium-grained sandstone and siltstone, with minor deposits of claystone. Hawkesbury Sandstone occasionally overlies the Terrigal Formation.

See also 
 Sydney Basin
 Munmorah Conglomerate
 Newport Formation
 Narrabeen group

References 

Geologic formations of Australia
Triassic Australia
Sandstone formations
Geology of New South Wales